FJI may refer to:
 Fellow of the Institute of Journalists
 Fiji
 Fiji Airways
 Florida Justice Institute